Mary Anne Barlow (born 21 November 1973) is a South African actress and voice artist. She is best known for her roles in the popular serials Mama Jack, Wild at Heart, Prey and Legacy.

Personal life
She was born on 21 November 1973 in Harare, Zimbabwe. she started her Diploma in Dramatic Art and later graduated in 1997.

Career
She performed in the popular theatre play Eskorts in 1997 performed at the Mandy Breytenbach Theatre in Pretoria and The Vagina Monologue Excerpts in 2003. In 2006, she appeared in a lead role on the television serial Shado's. She also played the role of 'Dr. Sam Jones' in the Season 4 of the serial Jacob's Cross.

She is best known for her role as 'Coreen McKenzie Edwards' in the popular televisioin serial Egoli: Place of Gold from 1997 to 2003. She has also appeared in several international television serials such as; role 'Vanessa' in the British television series Wild at Heart since 2009. She made several supportive roles in the films Last Rites of Passage and Cape of Good Hope. In 2004, she made the lead titular role in the film Roxi. Then she starred in the 2005 film Mama Jack, along with Leon Schuster.

She has also acted in several television serials Isidingo, Binnelanders, Ihawu, Roer Jou Voete and Snitch. In 2016, she played the role of 'Margaret Wallace' in the television mini-series Cape Town.  From July 2020 to 2022 Barlow starred as the lead role "Felicity Price" in M-Net's first and successful telenovela 'Legacy'.

Filmography

References

External links
 

Living people
South African television actresses
South African film actresses
1973 births
People from Harare